Jared Spurgeon (born November 29, 1989) is a Canadian professional ice hockey defenceman and captain of the Minnesota Wild of the National Hockey League (NHL). Spurgeon was selected 156th overall by the New York Islanders in the 2008 NHL Entry Draft, from the major junior WHL's Spokane Chiefs where he won both a WHL Championship and the 2008 CHL Memorial Cup.

Playing career
After drafting him 156th overall in 2008, the New York Islanders failed to sign Spurgeon to a professional contract. After playing five seasons with the Spokane Chiefs in the Western Hockey League (WHL), where he won a Memorial Cup with the team, the Minnesota Wild invited the unsigned defenceman to attend their 2010–11 training camp. On September 23, 2010, Minnesota rewarded him by signing Spurgeon to a three-year, entry-level contract, assigning him to their American Hockey League (AHL) affiliate, the Houston Aeros.

Spurgeon played 23 games in the AHL before being recalled to the NHL to make his debut on his 21st birthday. Wearing number 46 for the Wild, Spurgeon played 14:42 minutes and registered one shot on goal in a 3–0 shutout loss to the Calgary Flames. He scored his first NHL goal on February 22 against Nikolai Khabibulin of the Edmonton Oilers.

During the 2012–13 NHL lockout Spurgeon and Tyler Ennis, best friends since boyhood, played together for the SCL Tigers of the National League A in Switzerland.

On December 21, 2015, the Minnesota Wild announced they signed Spurgeon to a 4-year, $20.75 million contract extension. He played much of the season on the Wild's top defensive pairing with Ryan Suter.

On September 14, 2019, with one year remaining on his contract, Spurgeon signed a seven-year, $53.025 million contract extension with the Wild. He was named the franchise's second full-time captain in January 2021 before the start of the Covid virus-delayed season.

Personal life
Spurgeon and his wife Danielle  have four children.

Spurgeon's older brother, Tyler Spurgeon, is also a professional hockey player. At a young age, Jared grew up watching his brother play hockey and he slowly began to idolize his brother. After seeing his brother enjoy his time on the ice, Jared credits his brother igniting his interest in the game and helping him transition into hockey. Jared started skating at the age of 4.

Spurgeon and Tyler Ennis were born less than two months apart and grew up in the same Edmonton neighbourhood, playing on the same teams, often with their fathers coaching, and spending summers at the Spurgeon family's lake cabin. In the NHL, Spurgeon and Ennis were teammates on the Minnesota Wild for one season.

Career statistics

References

External links

1989 births
Canadian ice hockey defencemen
Houston Aeros (1994–2013) players
Living people
Minnesota Wild players
New York Islanders draft picks
SCL Tigers players
Spokane Chiefs players
Ice hockey people from Edmonton
Canadian expatriate ice hockey players in Switzerland